Danchrisandre "Dan" Delgado Davila (born September 17, 1991) is a Mexican-born-American professional soccer player who plays as a midfielder.

Career

Early career
Delgado played college soccer at the University of San Diego between 2009 and 2012. While in college, he also appeared for the USL PDL club Orange County Blue Star in 2012.

Professional
On January 17, 2013, Delgado was drafted in the second round of the 2013 MLS SuperDraft (33rd overall) by San Jose Earthquakes. Delgado was not signed by the club, although he did appear for the Earthquakes' reserve team.

In 2014, Delgado began the season with the USL PDL club Ventura County Fusion, before signing with USL Pro's Oklahoma City Energy on June 26, 2014.

References

1991 births
Living people
American soccer players
American sportspeople of Mexican descent
Association football midfielders
OKC Energy FC players
Orange County Blue Star players
San Diego Toreros men's soccer players
San Jose Earthquakes draft picks
Soccer players from California
Sportspeople from Escondido, California
USL Championship players
USL League Two players
Ventura County Fusion players
Place of birth missing (living people)